The United States Air Force's 243d Air Traffic Control Squadron (243 ATCS) is an Air Traffic Control unit located at Cheyenne Air National Guard Base, Wyoming.

Mission
The 243rd ATCS is one of only ten ANG Air Traffic Control Squadrons located throughout the
United States.
Their mission is to deploy and employ Air Traffic Control services worldwide.

An important part of the Guard air traffic control mission includes establishing bases in locations without existing air traffic control facilities.

History
242 Air Traffic Control Flight was given a change of station order on 1 July 1996 from Spokane, Washington to Cheyenne, Wyoming.  The 242 Air Traffic Control Flight was redesignated the 243 Air Traffic Control Squadron on 1 November 1996.

The 243rd was one of the first units activated in support of Operation Enduring Freedom after the September 11 attacks. The unit was deployed to Jacobabad, Pakistan.

Awards
 2014 - RAPCON D. Ray Hardin Air Traffic Control Facility of the Year

Career Fields
The 243rd ATCS has numerous career fields including: Air Traffic Controller, Airfield Systems, Ground Radar Systems, Electrical Power Production, Heating Ventilation and Air Conditioning (HVAC), Logistics Plans, Material Management Administrative, and Personnel.

Bases stationed
 Cheyenne Air National Guard Base, Wyoming  (1996 – present)

References

External links
 Wyoming Air National Guard

Squadrons of the United States Air National Guard
Military units and formations in Wyoming